Quiabentia verticillata is a species of cactus found from Bolivia to Argentina, infrequent in plain or mid-mountain habitats. It grows in dry sandy soils, typically found at the edge of fields, in wastelands, at the side of roads, and opportunistically in vineyards and orchards when they are not irrigated.

It is an erect woody succulent plant, growing to 6 m tall. Like many cactuses, it bears leaves which have become specialized as spines (protecting the plant from browsing by herbivores), as well as succulent leaf blades (soon deciduous). The spines actually consist of the stipules of the leaves. The stems are enlarged for water storage, and have a somewhat angular cross-section.

Cultivation and uses
Like most cactuses, it is a xerophyte, making it capable of growing in areas receiving very little rainfall. It has a laterally extensive, shallow root system.

References 

External links

verticillata